Muzi Koti-ye Sofla (also Romanized as Mūzī Kotī-ye Soflá; also known as Mūzī Gotī-ye Pā’īn and Mūzīkūtī-ye Pā’īn) is a village in Dabuy-ye Jonubi Rural District, Dabudasht District, Amol County, Mazandaran Province, Iran. At the 2006 census, its population was 238, in 64 families.

References 

Populated places in Amol County